This is a list of cases reported in volume 275 of United States Reports, decided by the Supreme Court of the United States in 1927 and 1928.

Justices of the Supreme Court at the time of volume 275 U.S. 

The Supreme Court is established by Article III, Section 1 of the Constitution of the United States, which says: "The judicial Power of the United States, shall be vested in one supreme Court . . .". The size of the Court is not specified; the Constitution leaves it to Congress to set the number of justices. Under the Judiciary Act of 1789 Congress originally fixed the number of justices at six (one chief justice and five associate justices). Since 1789 Congress has varied the size of the Court from six to seven, nine, ten, and back to nine justices (always including one chief justice).

When the cases in volume 275 were decided the Court comprised the following nine members:

Notable Case in 275 U.S.

Lum v. Rice
In Lum v. Rice, 275 U.S. 78 (1927), the Supreme Court upheld blatant de jure discrimination against Asian-Americans, holding that the exclusion on account of race of a child of Chinese ancestry from a public school did not violate the Fourteenth Amendment to the United States Constitution. The decision effectively approved the exclusion of any minority children from schools reserved for whites. Earl Brewer, a former governor of Mississippi, represented the Lums, arguing that forcing their girls to attend the inferior school for non-white children violated their Fourteenth Amendment rights, and that since they were not Black they should be allowed to attend the schools for whites. He was able to win the writ of mandamus they sought, but then the school district appealed to the Mississippi Supreme Court which unanimously reversed the lower court, holding that Mississippi's constitution and laws clearly distinguished Asians ("Mongolians", it called them) from whites, so the Lums could not attend white schools. On review in the U.S. Supreme Court, Chief Justice William Howard Taft's unanimous opinion ended with a pronouncement that all racial segregation in schools was constitutional. While it was overturned by Brown v. Board of Education a quarter-century later, it gave greater legal foundation to educational segregation in the short term and set back efforts to end it. It is remembered today for increasing the scope of permissible segregation. Historian and educator James Loewen called Lum "the most racist Supreme Court decision in the twentieth century". Legal scholar Jamal Greene has called it an "ugly and unfortunate" decision. "The Court's ruling had established a precedent more powerful than the Lum family could have imagined", observed Adrienne Berard, in Water Tossing Boulders, a history of the case. "By fighting, they had only made the enemy stronger."

Citation style 

Under the Judiciary Act of 1789 the federal court structure at the time comprised District Courts, which had general trial jurisdiction; Circuit Courts, which had mixed trial and appellate (from the US District Courts) jurisdiction; and the United States Supreme Court, which had appellate jurisdiction over the federal District and Circuit courts—and for certain issues over state courts. The Supreme Court also had limited original jurisdiction (i.e., in which cases could be filed directly with the Supreme Court without first having been heard by a lower federal or state court). There were one or more federal District Courts and/or Circuit Courts in each state, territory, or other geographical region.

The Judiciary Act of 1891 created the United States Courts of Appeals and reassigned the jurisdiction of most routine appeals from the district and circuit courts to these appellate courts. The Act created nine new courts that were originally known as the "United States Circuit Courts of Appeals." The new courts had jurisdiction over most appeals of lower court decisions. The Supreme Court could review either legal issues that a court of appeals certified or decisions of court of appeals by writ of certiorari. On January 1, 1912, the effective date of the Judicial Code of 1911, the old Circuit Courts were abolished, with their remaining trial court jurisdiction transferred to the U.S. District Courts.

Bluebook citation style is used for case names, citations, and jurisdictions.
 "# Cir." = United States Court of Appeals
 e.g., "3d Cir." = United States Court of Appeals for the Third Circuit
 e.g.,"D. Mass." = United States District Court for the District of Massachusetts
 "E." = Eastern; "M." = Middle; "N." = Northern; "S." = Southern; "W." = Western
 e.g.,"M.D. Ala." = United States District Court for the Middle District of Alabama
 "Ct. Cl." = United States Court of Claims
 The abbreviation of a state's name alone indicates the highest appellate court in that state's judiciary at the time.
 e.g.,"Pa." = Supreme Court of Pennsylvania
 e.g.,"Me." = Supreme Judicial Court of Maine

List of cases in volume 275 U.S.

Notes and references

External links
  Case reports in volume 275 from Library of Congress
  Case reports in volume 275 from Court Listener
  Case reports in volume 275 from the Caselaw Access Project of Harvard Law School
  Case reports in volume 275 from Google Scholar
  Case reports in volume 275 from Justia
  Case reports in volume 275 from Open Jurist
 Website of the United States Supreme Court
 United States Courts website about the Supreme Court
 National Archives, Records of the Supreme Court of the United States
 American Bar Association, How Does the Supreme Court Work?
 The Supreme Court Historical Society